Kupiainen is a Finnish surname. Notable people with the surname include:

 Antti Kupiainen (born 1954), Finnish mathematical physicist
 Matias Kupiainen (born 1983), Finnish guitarist, songwriter, and record producer

Finnish-language surnames